= Michael Stoolmiller =

American psychologist

- Citizenship: American
- Education: University of Oregon
- Scientific career
- Fields: Psychology
- Workplaces: University of Oregon
- Thesis: Parent supervision, child wandering and child antisocial behavior: A latent growth curve analysis (1990)
- Doctoral advisor: Richard Rankin

Michael Lawrence Stoolmiller is an American psychologist and research associate at the University of Oregon College of Education. He is also an affiliated scientist at the Oregon Social Learning Center. He is known for researching the effects of family and peer characteristics on the development of antisocial behavior in adolescents.
